KNME-TV (channel 5), branded on-air as NM PBS, is a PBS member television station in Albuquerque, New Mexico, United States. Jointly owned by the University of New Mexico and Albuquerque Public Schools, it is a sister station to Santa Fe–licensed KNMD-TV (channel 5). Both stations share studios on UNM's North Campus on University Boulevard Northeast in Albuquerque, while KNME-TV's transmitter is located atop Sandia Crest.

History
In 1957, the University of New Mexico Board of Regents and Albuquerque Public Schools reached a deal to jointly file for the channel 5 educational allocation in Albuquerque. The application was filed with the Federal Communications Commission on July 19 and granted on October 23. Plans were drawn up to use the new station to beam junior college classes to outlying areas, while a studio was set up in a converted sorority house on the UNM campus.

Edith Buchanan's English class was the first program broadcast over KNME-TV on May 1, 1958. By 1960, the station had expanded from college courses to provide programs for Albuquerque public school students in science and Spanish. That same year, a Ford Foundation grant enabled the station to purchase its first video tape equipment. In 1969, KNME began live coverage of the New Mexico state legislature.

Local programs have included reports leading up to and after the New Mexico State Penitentiary riot and the Peabody Award-winning series Surviving Columbus on the Pueblo Indians (1992).

Technical information

Subchannels
The station's digital signal is multiplexed:

KNME-TV was first in New Mexico to broadcast a digital signal, signing on KNME-DT in 2001. On January 18, 2017, PBS Kids replaced the Spanish-language V-me network, which had aired on channel 5.2 for about ten years, with V-me planning to transition to a commercial cable channel in 2017. The channel, however, had never caught on with Spanish-speaking audiences. Since Fall 2016, KNME carries First Nations Experience (FNX), a channel devoted to Native American programming.

On February 15, 2021, World Channel began airing on channel 5.4 and Create debuted on 5.5. These channels, simulcasts of KNMD-TV 9.1 and 9.2, were added in preparation for KNMD-TV's planned June 30 conversion to ATSC 3.0 format; KNMD-TV will simulcast the entire KNME multiplex.

Analog-to-digital conversion
KNME-TV shut down its analog signal, over VHF channel 5, on June 12, 2009, the official date in which full-power television stations in the United States transitioned from analog to digital broadcasts under federal mandate. The station's digital signal remained on its pre-transition UHF channel 35. Through the use of PSIP, digital television receivers display the station's virtual channel as its former VHF analog channel 5.

Television programs produced by New Mexico PBS
New Mexico PBS produces several television programs, including:
 ¡Colores! - a weekly art series with stories devoted to the creative spirit.
 New Mexico in Focus - a weekly, prime-time news magazine show covering the events, issues, and people that are shaping life in New Mexico and the Southwest.
 Public Square - community engagement through meaningful dialogue.

WestLink
KNME also operates the satellite service WestLink, which shares programming with other public television stations and several commercial clients. Satellite interviews from New Mexico on news networks like CNN often originate at New Mexico PBS. Shows distributed on WestLink include Democracy Now! and Creative Living with Sheryl Borden.

TALNET
From 1995 to 2010, KNME operated TALNET (an acronym for "Teach and Learn Network"), an educational cable channel for Albuquerque. It broadcast a mix of PBS and Annenberg Media programming and local school board meetings on Comcast cable channel 96 in Albuquerque.

Translators

References

External links
 

PBS member stations
University of New Mexico
Television channels and stations established in 1958
Mass media in Albuquerque, New Mexico
NME-TV
Low-power television stations in the United States
First Nations Experience affiliates
1958 establishments in New Mexico